Mansar can refer to:

 Mansar, Pakistan, town in Punjab, Pakistan
 Mansar, India, a town in Maharashtra
 Mansar Lake, a lake in Jammu and Kashmir

See also
 Mansa (disambiguation)